John Barre Toelken (June 15, 1935November 9, 2018) was an award-winning American folklorist, noted for his study of Native American material and oral traditions.

Early life and education 
Barre Toelken was born in Enfield, Massachusetts, to parents John and Sylvia Toelken. The family later moved to Springfield. He began to attend the Utah State University in 1953, where he graduated with a bachelor's degree in English. Toelken completed a master's degree in English literature from Washington State University, followed by a doctorate from the University of Oregon.

Career 
Toelken began his teaching career at the University of Oregon in 1966. During nearly twenty years at the University, Toelken would serve as director for both Folklore and Ethnic Studies and also the Randall V. Mills Archives of Northwest Folklore. Toelken returned to Utah State in 1985: there he would serve as the director of the Folklore Program and co-director of the Fife Folklore Conference. 

Toelken was known for his research into Navajo folklore, namely with the Yellowman family. Decades later, Toelken destroyed most of the physical records originating from his work with the Yellowman family, choosing to leave a set of cassette tapes with members of the family, not within an archive.

Recognition 
Over the course of his career, Toelken was president of the American Folklore Society from 1977 to 1978, and edited the Journal of American Folklore and Western Folklore. The American Folklore Society granted Toelken fellowship in 1981. He received four of the association's major awards: the Américo Paredes Prize and the Chicago Folklore Prize, both in 2007, followed by the Kenneth Goldstein Award for Lifetime Academic Leadership and the Lifetime Scholarly Achievement Award, in 2011 and 2016, respectively.

Toelken also served on the boards of a number of organisations, including the American Folklife Center of the Library of Congress, the National Endowment for the Arts Folklife Program, the Western Folklife Center, Utah Arts Council, and the International Ballad Commission.

Later years 
Toelken died in Logan, Utah, on November 9, 2018, aged 83.

Selected publications 
 
 
 Toelken, Barre. (1979) Dynamics of Folklore. Boston: Houghton Mifflin Co. OCLC 490869905.

References

1935 births
2018 deaths
American folklorists
University of Oregon alumni
University of Oregon faculty
Utah State University alumni
Utah State University faculty
Washington State University alumni
Academic journal editors
People from Enfield, Massachusetts
Writers from Springfield, Massachusetts
21st-century American male writers
20th-century American male writers
20th-century American writers
Presidents of the American Folklore Society